Phensang Monastery is a Buddhist monastery of the Nyingmapa Order in Sikkim, India, 9 kilometres north of Gangtok. It was established in 1721 during the time of Jigme Pawo.

References

Buddhist monasteries in Sikkim
1721 establishments in Asia